Tree of Life Christian Schools is a private, college preparatory Christian school located in Columbus, Ohio. It serves preschool, primary, and secondary students.

History
In the spring of 1978, members from the Linden Church of Christ, Beechwold Church of Christ, and Minerva Park Church of Christ came together to form the first school board of what was then called Linden Christian School. Over the years, Northeast Church of Christ, Indianola Church of Christ, Westerville Christian Church, North Park Church of Christ, Discover Christian Church, Hilliard Church of Christ and Worthington Christian Church joined the effort.

The initial student body was 47 students, preschool - grade 3.

Jayne Marrah, Tree of Life's first administrator, began with four other faculty. The school has grown to over 80 staff members.

Initially housed in the Linden Church of Christ, the school now has three locations. Two of those are sponsoring churches who provide facilities to the school rent-free. The Third location on Northridge Road was an empty Columbus public school, purchased in 1984 for $275,000. A regulation-sized gymnasium was completed in 1992 and a Library/Media Center in 2000. The four branches are referred to as Dublin, Indianola, Northridge, and (new location since 2019) Polaris.

The school was accredited by the Association of Christian Schools, International (ACSI) in 2015.

Courses offered
Tree of Life has a gradually increasing number of Advanced Placement (AP) and Honors courses for secondary level students, as well as many other challenging classes.
AP Calculus
AP Chemistry
AP English
AP Government
AP European History
AP Environmental Science.
Honors Geometry
Honors Psychology

Tree of Life also offers dual courses through Urbana University in Urbana, Ohio.

Notable alumni
Jay DeMarcus - bassist and harmony vocalist for the country band Rascal Flatts
Josh Dun - drummer of the music duo Twenty One Pilots

References

External links
  Official Website

Christian schools in Ohio
High schools in Franklin County, Ohio
Private high schools in Ohio
Private middle schools in Ohio
Private elementary schools in Ohio